Jean-Claude Lemoult (born 28 August 1960) is a French former professional football (soccer) player who played as a midfielder.

Lemoult was a member of the French squad that won the gold medal at the 1984 Summer Olympics in Los Angeles.

References

 http://www.fff.fr/servfff/historique/historique.php?cherche_joueur=LEMOULT&submit=go

1960 births
Living people
People from Neufchâteau, Vosges
Sportspeople from Vosges (department)
French footballers
France international footballers
Association football midfielders
Paris Saint-Germain F.C. players
Montpellier HSC players
Nîmes Olympique players
Ligue 1 players
Olympic footballers of France
Olympic gold medalists for France
Footballers at the 1984 Summer Olympics
Olympic medalists in football
Medalists at the 1984 Summer Olympics
Footballers from Grand Est